Bagnum is a hamlet in the English county of Hampshire.

Villages in Hampshire
Ringwood, Hampshire